Barycz  (German: Baritsch) is a village in the administrative district of Gmina Mściwojów, within Jawor County, Lower Silesian Voivodeship, in south-western Poland. Prior to 1945 it was in Germany.

It lies approximately 7 km north of Mściwojów, 8 km north-east of Jawor, and 55 km west of the regional capital Wrocław.

References

Barycz